Inbar Vinarsky (born ) is an Israeli female former volleyball player, playing as a central. She was part of the Israel women's national volleyball team.

She competed at the 2011 Women's European Volleyball Championship. At club level she played for Raanana VBC, and at university level she played for the University of San Francisco.

References

External links

1991 births
Living people
Israeli women's volleyball players
Place of birth missing (living people)